Angela Maffeis (born 24 May 1996) is an Italian professional racing cyclist. She rides for the Inpa Sottoli Giusfredi team.

See also
 List of 2015 UCI Women's Teams and riders

References

External links

1996 births
Living people
Italian female cyclists
Place of birth missing (living people)